Emily Bolton (born 10 February 1998) is an English international table tennis player. She is a doubles national champion and has represented England at the Commonwealth Games.

Biography
Bolton won the national women's doubles title in 2020, alongside Denise Payet, and also claimed a singles bronze medal in the same year at the English National Table Tennis Championships. At the 2022 edition she and Charlotte Bardsley were beaten by Tin-Tin Ho & Maria Tsaptsinos in the women's doubles final.

In 2022, she was selected for the 2022 Commonwealth Games in Birmingham where she competed in two events; the women's doubles and the women's team events. England reached the quarter finals in the latter event. Bolton had replaced the injured Mollie Patterson in the England squad.

References

1998 births
Living people
English female table tennis players
Table tennis players at the 2022 Commonwealth Games
Commonwealth Games competitors for England